is a Japanese novel by Natsuhiko Kyogoku. It is the second novel in the Kyōgokudō series that began with Summer of the Ubume. The novel has been turned into a live action feature film, a manga, and an anime television series.

Story
The story takes place between August and October, 1952. It primarily follows crime fiction writer Tatsumi Sekiguchi and news magazine editor Morihiko Toriguchi as they investigate, with the help of onmyōji Akihiko Chūzenji, a series of unusual crimes that take place in Musashino and Mitaka.

Kanako Yuzuki and Yoriko Kusumoto are friends and middle school students. The two plan to go to Lake Sagami over summer break. On the night they are to leave, Kanako is hit by the train on which Tokyo police detective Shutarō Kiba is traveling. After the hospital stabilizes Kanako, her older sister, Yōko Yuzuki, has Kanako transferred to Kōshirō Mimasaka's research hospital. Several days later, the discovery of a severed arm and two boxed, severed legs catches the attention of Toriguchi, who travels by automobile with Atsuko Chūzenji and Sekiguchi to investigate.

Yoriko tells Kiba that Kanako was pushed into the train by a man wearing gloves. Shortly afterward, Kanako is apparently abducted from the hospital; Mimasaka's assistant, Tarō Suzaki, is murdered; and Kanako's guardian, Noritada Amemiya, also disappears. Witnesses report seeing a gloved man in the area where three other girls are soon abducted. Residents of the surrounding area later discover the girls' boxed, severed limbs.

Noriyuki Masuoka, the lawyer for Kanako's grandfather, hires private investigator Reijirō Enokizu to find Kanako. Masuoka explains that Yōko is actually Kanako's mother. Kanako is unaware of her true parentage, but she is the only heir to the fortune of Yōkō Shibata, who appointed Amemiya as her guardian.

Toriguchi obtains a list, labeled "Onbako-sama", of believers in a local cult led by Hyōei Terada, a self-proclaimed onmyōji. Toriguchi believes Terada is involved with the dismemberment case, because all the dismemberment victims are daughters of Terada's followers. Sekiguchi notices two names on the list: Yoriko's mother, and fiction writer Shunkō Kubo. As a fellow writer for the same publisher, Sekiguchi already knows Kubo, who always wears gloves. After Enokizu and Sekiguchi meet with Yoriko, she meets Kubo, who takes her to an abandoned temple filled with boxes. Later, Yoriko's severed arms are found.

From reading Kubo's latest fiction work, Chūzenji deduces that Kubo is the perpetrator of the dismemberment case. Chūzenji, Sekiguchi, and Enokizu confront Terada, and demonstrate that all of Terada's practices are fake. Terada confesses his swindle to the police, and reveals that Kubo is his son. Meanwhile, Tokyo police detective Bunzō Aoki goes to the abandoned temple that Kubo is using, but Kubo escapes. Later, Kubo's severed limbs are found.

Chūzenji tells Sekiguchi, Toriguchi, and Enokizu that he knew Mimasaka during the war. Mimasaka's research involved replacing biological human body parts with mechanical ones. Meanwhile, Kiba accuses Mimasaka of dismembering girls to further his research, and demands to know what he has done with Kanako. Sekiguchi, Toriguchi, and Enokizu pick up Yōko and arrive at Mimasaka's facility. Yōko tells them Mimasaka is her father. Chūzenji soon arrives with Masuoka, Aoki, and police constable Fukumoto.

Chūzenji recounts the series of events, beginning with Yoriko pushing Kanako onto the train tracks. Suzaki had been blackmailing Yōko, because he knew that Kanako was not Yōkō Shibata's legitimate heir. Since Mimasaka could keep only Kanako's head alive mechanically, Suzaki could easily stage her kidnapping and demand a ransom from Shibata. The first severed limbs found, before Kanako's abduction, were Kanako's. After Suzaki took Kanako's head, Amemiya killed Suzaki and ran away with Kanako's head. Kubo met Amemiya on a train and saw Kanako's head alive inside a box. Kubo himself then tried to keep the heads of other girls alive in a box. Kubo wrote about it all in his fiction. Before he killed Yoriko, she told him about Mimasaka. When he went to Mimasaka, in hopes of learning how to replicate what he saw, Mimasaka instead performed the same procedure on Kubo.

Aoki tries to arrest Mimasaka for what he did to Kubo, but Mimasaka grabs the box with Kubo's head and tries to escape with Yōko. Kubo bites Mimasaka in the neck and kills him, so Yōko kills Kubo. Kiba arrests Yōko for the murder of Kubo.

Publication
The original novel was first published in 1995, and has been reprinted in several bunko editions.

Adaptations

Film 
The novel was turned into a 2007 live action movie, directed by Masato Harada and starring Shinichi Tsutsumi, Hiroshi Abe, Kippei Shiina, Hiroyuki Miyasako, and Rena Tanaka.

Shooting started in 2005 and completed in May 2007. The significant events of the novel are unchanged, but the remainder of the content is a bold alteration. To simulate 1952 Tokyo, exteriors were shot in Shanghai.

Mitsuki Tanimura won Best Supporting Actress at the 2008 Osaka Film Festival for her portrayal of Yoriko Kusumoto.

The DVD was released June 25, 2008.

Animated TV series 
The anime adaptation began airing on October 7, 2008. Produced by Madhouse, Nippon TV, D.N. Dream Partners and VAP, the series was directed by Ryōsuke Nakamura, with Sadayuki Murai handling series composition, Clamp and Asako Nishida designing the characters and Shūsei Murai composing the music. The opening and ending themes of the anime are "Lost in Blue" and "NAKED LOVE" by the Japanese rock group Nightmare.

The series follows the novel, but some of the minor characters are slightly changed, and the series includes some original material. The original material includes:
 The sequences in which Sekiguchi reads his own work and the fiction of Kubo
 The clairvoyance experiments in episode 5
 Additional wartime experimentation ascribed to the research unit where Chūzenji and Mimasaka were staffed, apparently based on Unit 731 and Number Nine Research Laboratory

The anime distributor VAP released the Blu-ray disc of the television series on May 22, 2009 with a 16-minute OVA extra exclusive to the Blu-ray, revealing the investigative notes that Atsuko wrote in episode 6 about the brutal dismembering incidents in the main story.

Characters

Principal characters

Crime fiction writer.

Magazine news editor.

Tokyo police detective.

Private investigator with the Rose Cross Detective Agency.

Significant characters

Medical researcher.

Mimasaka's assistant.

Gothic fiction writer, the mysterious gloved man.

Cult leader and fake onmyōji.

Yuzuki family and associates

Middle school student.

Kanako's "older sister", formerly a film actress with the stage name .

Lawyer for Shibata Financial and private lawyer for Kanako's grandfather, .

Kanako's guardian, appointed by Yōkō Shibata.

Kusumoto family and associates

Middle school student and Kanako's friend.

Yoriko's mother.

Kimie's male friend.

Police

Tokyo police detective.

Kanagawa police administrator, inspector rank.

Musashino policeman, constable rank.

Other characters

Akihiko's younger sister, a reporter for Toriguchi's magazine.

Akihiko's wife.

Tatsumi's wife.

Episode List

Notes

Manga 
The manga adaptation features art by Aki Shimizu and a script by Natsuhiko Kyogoku himself, and began serialization in 2007. It is five volumes long.

References

External links
 Movie official website
 Anime official website
 
 

Fiction set in 1952
Fiction set in the 1950s
1995 novels
2007 manga
Films based on Japanese novels
Films directed by Masato Harada
Horror anime and manga
Incest in fiction
Japanese crime thriller films
Japanese horror novels
Japanese mystery novels
Japanese novels adapted into films
Kadokawa Shoten manga
Kyōgōkudō series
Madhouse (company)
Mystery anime and manga
Psychological novels
Seinen manga
Works by Clamp (manga artists)
Japanese mystery films